Events from the year 1841 in the United Kingdom.

Incumbents
 Monarch – Victoria
 Prime Minister – William Lamb, 2nd Viscount Melbourne (Whig) (until 30 August); Robert Peel (Conservative) (starting 30 August)
 Foreign Secretary –  Henry John Temple, 3rd Viscount Palmerston (until 2 September) George Hamilton-Gordon, 4th Earl of Aberdeen (starting 2 September)
 Parliament – 13th (until 23 June), 14th (starting 19 August)

Events
 4 January – City of Dublin Steam Packet Company  is wrecked on the Western Rocks, Isles of Scilly, with the loss of 61 of the 65 onboard; at least 20 other ships run aground round the British Isles today.
 20 January – Convention of Chuenpi agreed between Charles Elliot and Qishan of the Qing dynasty.
 26 January – the United Kingdom formally occupies Hong Kong.
 27 January – the active volcano Mount Erebus in Antarctica is discovered and named by James Clark Ross.
 28 January – Ross discovers the "Victoria Barrier", later known as the Ross Ice Shelf.
 February – H. Fox Talbot obtains a patent for the calotype process in photography.
 10 February – Penny Red postage stamp replaces the Penny Black.
 20 February – the Governor Fenner, carrying emigrants to America, sinks off Holyhead with the loss of 123 lives.
 1 March – opening throughout of the Manchester and Leeds Railway, the first to cross the Pennines.
 4 March – first performance of Dion Boucicault's comedy London Assurance, presented by Charles Mathews at the Theatre Royal, Covent Garden.
 by April – Royal Botanic Gardens, Kew first opens to the public and William Hooker appointed director.
 3 May
 New Zealand becomes a separate British colony, having previously been administered as part of the Colony of New South Wales.
 London Library opens in Pall Mall.
 6 June (Sunday)
 United Kingdom Census held, the first to record names and approximate ages of every household member and to be administered nationally.
 Marian Hughes becomes the first woman to take religious vows in communion with the Anglican Province of Canterbury since the Reformation, making them privately to E. B. Pusey in Oxford.
 7 June – Lord Melbourne loses a vote of no confidence against his government.
 21 June – St. Chad's Cathedral, Birmingham, dedicated as a Roman Catholic church.
 29 June–22 July – general election – Sir Robert Peel's Conservatives take control of the House of Commons.
 30 June – Great Western Railway completed throughout between London and Bristol.
 5 July – Thomas Cook arranges his first excursion, taking 570 temperance campaigners on the Midland Counties Railway from Leicester to a rally in Loughborough.
 17 July – first edition of the humorous magazine Punch published.
 26 July – the proprietors of The Skerries Lighthouse off Anglesey, the last privately owned light in the British Isles, are awarded £444,984 in compensation for its sale to Trinity House.
 28 August – Melbourne resigns as Prime Minister; replaced by Robert Peel.
 2 September – reconsecration of Leeds Parish Church after reconstruction.
 21 September – the London and Brighton Railway is opened throughout.
 24 September – United Kingdom annexes Sarawak from Brunei; James Brooke is appointed rajah.
 10 October – First Opium War: Battle of Chinhai – British capture a Chinese garrison.
 13 October – First Opium War: British occupy Ningbo.
 27 October – Anglican clergyman Richard Sibthorp becomes the first Tractarian to be received into the Roman Catholic Church, by Nicholas Wiseman at St Mary's College, Oscott (he reconverts two years later).
 30 October – a fire at the Tower of London destroys its Grand Armoury and causes a quarter of a million pounds worth of damage.
 13 November – surgeon James Braid attends his first demonstration of animal magnetism, which leads to his study of the subject he eventually calls hypnotism.
 23 December – First Anglo-Afghan War: at a meeting with the Afghan general Akbar Khan, the diplomat Sir William Hay Macnaghten is shot dead at close quarters.

Undated
 Antarctic explorer James Clark Ross additionally discovers the Ross Sea, Victoria Land and Mount Terror.
 Chemical Society of London founded by Thomas Graham.
 Ulster Canal completed.

Ongoing events
 First Opium War (1839–1842)
 First Anglo-Afghan War (1839–1842)

Publications
 W. Harrison Ainsworth's novel Old St. Paul's: A Tale of the Plague and the Fire (serialised in The Sunday Times, 3 January – 26 December).
 Thomas Carlyle's lectures On Heroes, Hero-Worship, and The Heroic in History.
 Serialisation of Charles Dickens's novel Barnaby Rudge: A Tale of the Riots of 'Eighty.
 Mrs Gore's novel Cecil, or Adventures of a Coxcomb.
 John Henry Newman's Tract 90 (Remarks on Certain Passages in the Thirty-Nine Articles, dated 25 January).
 Augustus Pugin's lectures The True Principles of Pointed or Christian Architecture.
 Samuel Warren's novel Ten Thousand a Year.
 Vocal Melodies of Scotland, containing the first publication of the song "The Bonnie Banks o' Loch Lomond".
 The Gardeners' Chronicle launched.
 The Jewish Chronicle launched; the first Jewish newspaper in the UK, it will be the oldest continuously published in the world when it ceases publication in 2020 (12 November).

Births
 25 January – Jackie Fisher, admiral (died 1920)
 28 January – Henry Morton Stanley, explorer and journalist (died 1904)
 9 November – King Edward VII (died 1910)
 William George Aston, consular official (died 1911)

Deaths
 2 February – Olinthus Gregory, mathematician (born 1774)
 12 February – Astley Cooper, surgeon and anatomist (born 1768)
 17 February – Joseph Chitty, lawyer and legal writer (born 1775)
 22 April – Edward Draper, army officer and colonial administrator (born 1776)
 20 May –  Joseph Blanco White, theologian (born 1775)
 1 June – Sir David Wilkie, Scottish painter (born 1785)
 3 July – Rosemond Mountain, actress and singer (born 1780s?)
 24 August – Theodore Hook, author (born 1788)
 1 December – George Birkbeck, doctor, academic and philanthropist (born 1776)
 23 December – Sir William Hay Macnaghten, Anglo-Indian diplomat (born 1793)

See also
 1841 in Scotland

References

 
Years of the 19th century in the United Kingdom